Castle is the second book in Garth Nix's The Seventh Tower series, published on 1 November 2000 by Scholastic. The cover design and art are by Madalina Stefan and Steve Rawlings respectively.

Plot
Tal and Milla make it from the shadowy 'Dark World' to the titular castle, a seeming place of peace. Both are unwanted by the castle's inhabitants, Milla the most. The two must avoid conspiracies and other dangers inside the castle, just to survive.

References 

2000 Australian novels
2000 children's books
2000 fantasy novels
Children's fantasy novels
Australian children's novels
Novels by Garth Nix